Lala Wane (born  July 15, 1989) is a Senegalese basketball player for USO Basket. She represented Senegal in the basketball competition at the 2016 Summer Olympics.

References

External links

Senegalese women's basketball players
Basketball players at the 2016 Summer Olympics
Olympic basketball players of Senegal
1989 births
Living people
Senegalese expatriate basketball people in France
Senegalese expatriate basketball people in Germany
Senegalese expatriate sportspeople in Germany
Forwards (basketball)